The year 1780 in architecture involved some significant events.

Buildings and structures

Buildings
 April 17 – Grand Théâtre de Bordeaux in France, designed by Victor Louis is inaugurated.
 June 24 – Chesme Church in Saint Petersburg, designed by Yury Felten, is consecrated.
 Assumption Cathedral, Kharkiv, Ukraine, is consecrated.
 Fragrant Hills Pagoda in China is completed.
 Kashi Vishwanath Temple on the Ganges in Varanasi, Uttar Pradesh, is built.
 Xumi Fushou Temple in Chengde Mountain Resort, China, is built.
 Royal Villa of Monza in Lombardy, designed by Giuseppe Piermarini, is completed.
 Reconstruction of Palazzo Tucci in Lucca, Tuscany by Ottaviano Diodati is commissioned.

Births
 October 1 – Robert Smirke, English architect (died 1867)

Deaths
 April 23 – Sanderson Miller, English Gothic Revival architect and landscape designer (born 1716)
 August 29 – Jacques-Germain Soufflot, French architect (born 1713)

References

Architecture
Years in architecture
18th-century architecture